Tashtimerovo (Taştimer) is a rural locality (a village) in Tashtimerovsky Selsoviet, Abzelilovsky District, Bashkortostan, Russia. The population was 382 as of 2010. There are 10 streets.

Geography 
Tashtimerovo is located 22 km northeast of Askarovo (the district's administrative centre) by road. Abzelilovo is the nearest rural locality.

References 

Rural localities in Abzelilovsky District